Route 39 may refer to:

Route 39 (WMATA), a bus route in Washington, D.C.
London Buses route 39

See also
List of highways numbered 39

39